Ellen Keane (born 6 April 1995) is an Irish Paralympic swimmer and gold medallist competing in S9, SM9 and SB8 classification events.

Career

Keane won three bronze medals at world championships before winning a bronze medal in the 100 m breaststroke (SB8) at the 2016 Summer Paralympics, and gold at the same event at the 2020 Summer Paralympics.

Personal life
Keane was born with an undeveloped left arm and competes as an amputee. She is a student at Dublin Institute of Technology.

In June 2017 she was honoured by the Lord Mayor of Dublin, Brendan Carr, with a Lord Mayor's Award, which is awarded 'to citizens who, through their ordinary everyday lives, enrich this city in an extraordinary way'.

Media appearances

In 2017, Keane gave a TEDx Talk Entitled 'My Lucky Fin' telling the story of how she changed the way of looking at her own disability - and how that in turn changed her entire life.

In 2022, Keane appeared on the fifth series of the Irish version of Dancing With the Stars overall Keane finished the competition in second place losing out on the win to Nina Carberry and her pro-partner Pasquale La Rocca.

Culture

For International women's day in 2022 An Post launched a stamp collection of Irish sports women which featured Keane and others.

Ellen was joint Grand Marshall with Kellie Harrington at the Dublin St. Patrick’s Day parade on 17 March 2022.

References

1995 births
Living people
Irish female swimmers
Paralympic swimmers of Ireland
S9-classified Paralympic swimmers
Paralympic gold medalists for Ireland
Paralympic bronze medalists for Ireland
Swimmers at the 2016 Summer Paralympics
Swimmers at the 2020 Summer Paralympics
Medalists at the 2016 Summer Paralympics
Medalists at the 2020 Summer Paralympics
Medalists at the World Para Swimming Championships
Medalists at the World Para Swimming European Championships
Sportspeople from Dublin (city)
Paralympic medalists in swimming
21st-century Irish women